KLDF-CD, virtual and UHF digital channel 17, is a low-powered, Class A Estrella TV-affiliate television station serving Santa Barbara, California, United States that is licensed to Lompoc. The station is owned by HC2 Holdings.

History 
The station’s construction permit was issued on September 28, 1995, under the calls of K17EF. It changed to KLDF-CA on May 9, 2006, and then to the current callsign of KLDF-CD on June 3, 2015.

Digital channel

References

External links

Innovate Corp.
LDF-CD
Television channels and stations established in 1995
Low-power television stations in the United States